Camara Jones (born May 15, 1972) was an American sprinter who specialized in the 400 metres.

Her foremost achievement was a gold medal in the 4 × 400 metres relay at the 1995 World Championships. Her personal best time was 51.44 seconds, achieved in May 1995 in Tucson.

References

1972 births
Living people
American female sprinters
World Athletics Championships medalists
Universiade medalists in athletics (track and field)
Universiade silver medalists for the United States
World Athletics Championships winners
Medalists at the 1995 Summer Universiade
20th-century American women